Manic Hispanic is an American Chicano punk rock band from Orange County and Los Angeles, California, United States. They are a comedy act that plays cover versions of punk rock "standards" by slightly renaming songs and adjusting lyrics with humorous references to Chicano culture. The band's members are all Mexican and use stage names further marking the Mexican/Chicano image of the band. Manic Hispanic is a supergroup made up of former and/or current members of The Adolescents, The Grabbers, Punk Rock Karaoke, The X-Members, 22 Jacks, Final Conflict, Agent Orange, Death by Stereo and The Cadillac Tramps.

Band formation 
Manic Hispanic was originally started in 1992 by Mike "Gabby" Gaborno (a.k.a. Jefe) from The Cadillac Tramps and Steve Soto (a.k.a. El Hoakie Loco) from The Adolescents/22 Jacks, originally with the intent to perform doo-wop versions of punk songs. Members later recruited are: Chino and Mo Grease (members of The Grabbers), Oso (from The Cadillac Tramps), Mad Ralphie (a.k.a. Steve"Ace" Acevedo a Sound Engineer and tour manager), and Sonny Lucas (a.k.a. Tio).  According to their Myspace page, the band members have changed since their first album.

The name of the band keeps with their habit of mashing up Latin/Cholo culture with punk culture, the name being a play on Manic Panic, a brand of hair dye popular in the punk scene.

Recorded material 
Their first album was released in 1995 on Doctor Dream records.  Entitled The Menudo Incident, a reference to Guns N' Roses' The Spaghetti Incident, it featured cover versions of songs by The Buzzcocks, The Damned, X, Black Flag, Wire, The Clash, and others.  These cover versions featured rewritten lyrics humorously reflecting the Chicano identity of the band and Chicano/Mexican culture as a whole. Tracks commonly include lyrics sung in Spanish, English, and Chicano "slang" a.k.a. Caló. Examples include songs such as The Damned's "New Rose" retitled "New Rosa", and Eddie and the Subtitles' "American Society" retitled "Mexican Society."  The Menudo Incident also contains a version of Tejano/country musician Freddy Fender's "Before the Next Teardrop Falls", a bilingual hit when released by Fender in the 1970s. The cover art mimicked the Guns N' Roses release, showing a bowl of menudo, the traditional Mexican tripe specialty.

The band returned with a second album in 2001, The Recline of Mexican Civilization (spoofing the punk film The Decline of Western Civilization) for BYO Records. BYO also released Mijo Goes to Jr. College (aping The Descendents' Milo Goes To College) in 2003, and Grupo Sexo (spoofing the Circle Jerks' Group Sex) in 2005. These albums modify the original cover art of the albums they are playing off of. The band's out-of-print debut album, The Menudo Incident, was reissued by BYO in 2003.

The band has also released T-shirts based on the Ramones logo, Dead Kennedys' graphics, and the Social Distortion logo.

Chicano identity 
The band's biography information from BYO Records is written in a humorous style, alleging in jest that forming the band was suggestion by one of their parole officers.  Although this may be interpreted as tongue-in-cheek, the band has declared in an interview for InMusicWeTrust.com that, "we're not cholos or gangsters, but we come from that heritage and we're proud of it."

While most of the band's material is delivered with a sense of humor, political undertones do occasionally appear in their music, such as "Poem" from The Menudo Incident, tells a first-hand account of fearing a potential drive-by shooting, told over a doo-wop backing. In addition, their cover of Iggy & The Stooges' "I Got A Right" includes the lyric, "I got a right, got a right to speak/any language I want, yeah." The band also traditionally plays live in California on Cinco de Mayo.

Lineup 
 Mike "Gabby" Gaborno (a.k.a. Jefe) - Vocals from Heaven, RIP 2017
 Steve Soto (a.k.a. El Hoakie Loco) - Guitar, Vocals (d. 2018)
 Chino - Drums
 Mo Grease - Guitar
 Oso - Bass
 Mad Ralphie - Vocals
 Tio - Vocals
 Efrem Martinez Schulz - Vocals

Discography 
 The Menudo Incident (1995, Doctor Dream Records; Reissued in 2003, BYO Records Reissued Limited Edition Vinyl in 2018 Indecision Records)
 The Recline of Mexican Civilization (2001, BYO Records)
 Mijo Goes to Jr. College (2003, BYO Records)
 Grupo Sexo (2005, BYO Records)
 Back In Brown (2021)

References

External links 
 Manic Hispanic at MySpaceMANIC HISPANIC | Listen and Stream Free Music, Albums, New Releases, Photos, Videos
 Interview with Mad Ralphie and Tio In Music We Trust - INTERVIEW: Manic Hispanic: Punk Band
 Manic Hispanic at BYO Records, includes biography BYO RECORDS - Punk Since 1982 - Web.archive.org
 Manic Hispanic at AllMusic 
 Official Site (currently offline February 12, 2009) manichispanic.net

Hardcore punk groups from California
Supergroups (music)
BYO Records artists
Musical groups established in 1992
Musical groups disestablished in 2017
1992 establishments in California
2017 disestablishments in California
Musical groups from Orange County, California